The bicolor minnow (Tampichthys dichromus) is a species of cyprinid fish endemic to Mexico.

References

Cyprinid fish of North America
Fish of Central America
Freshwater fish of Mexico
Fish described in 1977
Tampichthys